The 2006 Kvalserien was the 32nd edition of the Kvalserien. It determined two teams of the participating ones would play in the 2006–07 Elitserien season and which four teams would play in the 2006–07 HockeyAllsvenskan season.

Tournament

External links
Tournament on hockeyarchives.info

Kvalserien
Kval